The Arboretum de Gratteloup (1 hectare) is an arboretum located in the Forêt du Dom near Bormes-les-Mimosas, Var, Provence-Alpes-Côte d'Azur, France. It is open daily without charge.

The arboretum was created in 1935 by the Office National des Forêts (ONF) and expanded in the late 1980s. It is dedicated to experimental forestry and conservation, and contains both local and exotic specimens, including endangered species. In 2005 the arboretum contained 197 conifer species and 268 species of deciduous trees, with walking paths and explanatory signs.

See also 
 List of botanical gardens in France

References 
 Var Tourisme: La Route des Forêts de Légende, page 11
 BaLaDO.fr entry (French)
 Web Provence entry (French)
 Bormes-les-Mimosas description (French)
 IKEA description (French)
 Travel DK description

Gratteloup, Arboretum de
Gratteloup, Arboretum de